Omar Jatta (born 1 January 1989) is a Gambian footballer who is currently playing for FC 08 Villingen.

External links

1989 births
Living people
Gambian footballers
Stuttgarter Kickers players
FV Ravensburg players
3. Liga players
People from Brikama
Association football forwards